The East Black Sea Region (Turkish: Doğu Karad‘eniz Bölgesi) (TR9) is a statistical region in Turkey.

Subregion and provinces 

 Trabzon Subregion (TR90)
 Trabzon Province (TR901)
 Ordu Province (TR902)
 Giresun Province (TR903)
 Rize Province (TR904)
 Artvin Province (TR905)
 Gümüşhane Province (TR906)

Age groups

Internal immigration

State register location of East Black Sea residents

Marital status of 15+ population by gender

Education status of 15+ population by gender

See also 

 NUTS of Turkey

References

External links 
 TURKSTAT

Sources 
 ESPON Database

Statistical regions of Turkey